Kemon Hall (born June 2, 1997) is an American football cornerback for the Los Angeles Chargers of the National Football League (NFL). He played college football for North Texas and was signed by the Chargers as an undrafted free agent in 2019.

Early life and education
Kemon Hall was born on June 2, 1997, in Calhoun City, Mississippi. He attended Calhoun City High School there before going to college at Itawamba CC. As a sophomore, Hall recorded 45 tackles in nine games. After the year he transferred to North Texas. In his first game in the NCAA, he started at cornerback and made four solo tackles. He posted his first career interception against SMU the next week, also making five tackles and deflecting two passes.

The following week Hall made seven stops, a forced fumble, and a pass break-up against Iowa. He posted six stops the following week, while playing against UAB. He set a career-high in tackles the following week at Southern Miss, also recording one pass break-up. He made four tackles the following week, six stops the next, and six tackles against Old Dominion on October 28. He made 16 tackles during the following three games, against Louisiana Tech, UTEP, and Army. He finished the year with 72 tackles in 14 games, each a start.

Against SMU in the first game of 2018, Hall intercepted a pass and returned it 36 yards for his first career score. He intercepted another pass the following game against Incarnate Word. He scored his second career touchdown a week later, returning an interception 24 yards versus Arkansas. In the next game, Hall suffered an injury early on the made him miss multiple games. In his return nearly a month later, he made one tackle against UAB. His fourth interception of the year came against Old Dominion, in a loss on November 10. He finished the year 10th in the country for interceptions, with five. He also made 48 tackles and was a First-team All-Conference USA selection.

Professional career

Los Angeles Chargers
After going unselected in the 2019 NFL Draft, Hall was signed by the Los Angeles Chargers as an undrafted free agent on April 27. In four preseason games, he compiled eight tackles. He was released at roster cuts and signed to the practice squad the next day. He was released from the practice squad on September 10.

Minnesota Vikings
On December 31, 2019, Hall was signed to the practice squad of the Minnesota Vikings. He was signed to a future contract on January 12, 2020. He was released by the team on August 3.

New Orleans Saints
After a successful tryout with the New Orleans Saints, he was signed on August 25. He was waived on September 5 and signed to the practice squad the next day. He was released from the practice squad on September 19.

Dallas Cowboys
On December 23, ahead of their game against the Philadelphia Eagles, the Dallas Cowboys signed Hall to the practice squad. He was signed to a future contract on January 4. He was waived on May 5, 2021.

Los Angeles Chargers (second stint)
One day after being waived by Dallas, Hall was claimed by the Los Angeles Chargers who had originally signed him in 2019. He was waived by the Chargers on September 3. He was re-signed to the active roster on September 9, following an injury to Ryan Smith. He made his NFL debut in week one of the 2021 NFL season, playing 14 special teams snaps in a 20–16 win over the Washington Football Team. He finished his rookie year having appeared in all 16 games, while recording seven tackles and a fumble recovery.

On August 30, 2022, Hall was waived by the Chargers and signed to the practice squad the next day. He was promoted to the active roster on December 10. He was placed on injured reserve on December 26.

References

External links
Chargers 90-in-90: CB Kemon Hall

1997 births
Living people
Players of American football from Mississippi
American football defensive backs
North Texas Mean Green football players
Los Angeles Chargers players
Minnesota Vikings players
New Orleans Saints players
Dallas Cowboys players